Upstate Niagara Cooperative, Inc. is an American dairy cooperative located in Buffalo, New York. Products provided by the cooperative include milk, cream, butter, yogurt, half and half, juices, egg nog, cottage cheese, sour cream, ice cream mix and chip dips. Upstate Niagara Cooperative is owned by farmers throughout western New York State.

Primary production facilities are located in Buffalo, West Seneca, New York and Rochester, New York. A plant was also located in Manchester, New York, but has since closed. It was formerly owned by Dairy Center of the Finger Lakes before being purchased by the cooperative in 1979.

Brands
The family of brands for Upstate Niagara Cooperative:
Upstate Farms (formerly Upstate Milk)
Upstate Farms Food Services
Bison Foods
Intense Milk
Crave
O-AT-KA Milk Products Cooperative 
Valley Farms Dairy (Williamsport, PA)

History
The cooperative was started in 1965, originally known as Upstate Farms Cooperative. It was changed to the current name in 2006 when the business merged with longtime dairy producer Niagara Milk Producers Cooperative, Inc. of Niagara Falls, New York.

Upstate Niagara Cooperative acquired Bison Foods Company of Buffalo in 1983, a producer of cottage cheese, sour cream, chip dips and yogurt.

In 2011, Upstate Niagara Cooperative purchased a dairy plant in North Lawrence, New York from Healthy Food Holdings. The facility, built in 1900, has been through numerous owners including Borden, National Dairy Products Corporation and Kraft. It was established by the cooperative as North Country Dairy, LLC, which will continue to produce yogurt as it has been doing since 1969.

References

External links
Upstate Niagara Cooperative (Official Website)
Upstate Farms
Upstate Farms Food Services
Bison Foods Company
Intense Milk
O-AT-KA Milk Products Cooperative, Inc.

Dairy cooperatives
Agricultural supply cooperatives
Agriculture in New York (state)
Dairy products companies of the United States
Companies based in Buffalo, New York
American companies established in 1965
Food and drink companies established in 1965
1965 establishments in New York (state)
Agricultural cooperatives in the United States